Kameshnik is a rural locality (a village) in Rovdinskoye Rural Settlement of Shenkursky District, Arkhangelsk Oblast, Russia. The population was 26 as of 2010.

Geography 
It is located on the Sulanda River, 73 km southwest of Shenkursk (the district's administrative centre) by road. Ushakovskoye is the nearest rural locality.

References 

Rural localities in Shenkursky District
Shenkursky Uyezd